Die for the Government is the debut studio album by the U.S. punk rock band Anti-Flag, released in 1996. After this album, bassist Andy Flag played with Anti-Flag on their EP North America Sucks, but left soon after as they couldn't get along as a band. The CD booklet bids farewell to Andy Flag.

The front cover gives the title "Die for the Government", but side of the CD reads "Die for Your Government".

Background 
After forming in 1992, the band spent the next few years recording demos and appearing on compilations and splits with other Pittsburgh bands, as well as touring around the city. In 1995, they recorded and released their first solo EP, Kill Kill Kill. Nicky Garratt, at New Red Archives, heard the records and he contacted the band about releasing an album for the label. Despite their distrust of record labels in general, they eventually signed so they could distribute their music further nationally. Some members of the local community accused the band of selling out for signing with a national label.

During their tour for the ep, Andy and Justin did not get along, leading to many fights. By the time the band had returned to Pittsburgh, Andy had started fighting with Pat as well. Although they were able to record the album together, Andy left shortly after the record was finished. Despite their problems, Justin and Pat wished Andy well in the booklet, telling him to "remember the good times, forget the rest". As a result, Andy didn't play on the ensuing tour promoting the album before its release.

The CD booklet also featured an article from a local fanzine titled "It's Ok Not To Be A Dick", describing a recent punk show that resulted in damage to the venue and attacking the "jock punks" that were responsible.

Song Information 
Many of the songs on the record were written about the local punk scene, and included condemnation against the Nazi Punks that were infiltrating the music scene at the time, accusing them of ruining concerts and committing violent acts against other fans. The rest of the album features social-political songs heavily influenced by the Persian Gulf War back in 1991. Almost half the album was written back in 1992 and was featured on the band's first demo tapes.

You'd Do the Same, Kill the Rich, and No More Dead are all the same versions that were featured on the Kill Kill Kill EP. Davey Destroyed the Punk Scene was also featured on the ep, although it was rerecorded for the album.

You'd Do The Same attacks the hypocritical attitudes of those who have criticized the band for their beliefs. The title track is the only Anti-Flag song to use a fade out ending. Justin said that he was sitting in his room when he came up with the riff for the song, and started singing the words. He claimed that he knew in that moment that the song would capture the essence of what he wanted the band to be. The song references the Gulf War and criticizes the US government for using military lives for their personal gain. It was also written as a response to the nationalism and jingoism that was spread throughout the country, and in the music scene in particular. Drink Drank Punk is a fast-paced song that is from the point of view of a young punk fan who drinks heavily. Rotten Future was inspired by and a response to The Sex Pistols front-man Johnny Rotten, and the nihilism that was prevalent in punk music as a result of the Sex Pistols. Safe Tonight was a more personal track, with Justin singing about a kid in a violent home environment trying to run away.

Red, White, and Brainwashed was written back in 1992 and was one of the first songs written by the band to be politically based. Like the title track, the song criticized US military and government policy during the Gulf War. Despite claims on the internet, Davey Destroyed the Punk Scene was not written about Davey Havok of AFI, as the band had written the track back in 1992, years before they had met the band. They said that the name Davey was from the claymation show Davey and Goliath.

Summer Squatter is a more ska-influenced track than the rest of the album. The album's liner notes described the song as being against punks who came into the scene, ruined it for other fans, then left, and not being against the practice of squatting. Go-Go Dancer describes the protagonist falling in love with a girl who works at a punk show as a go-go dancer, and is unique among the Anti-Flag catalogue as being their only love song.

Police State in the USA references the Waco Siege and accuses the Clinton Administration of behaving like the Eastern European Communist countries. Punk By the Book is another track attacking "stereotypical punks" causing trouble for the scene. Fuck Police Brutality is a hardcore style track, and talks about Justin witnessing a police officer attack a kid for drinking outside a punk show, and getting a gun pulled on him when he tried to stop it (Pittsburgh at the time had one of the highest rates of police brutality in the US at the time). I'm being watched by the CIA features Justin sarcastically singing the first verse of The Star Spangled Banner before launching into another hardcore style song.

Kill the Rich and No More Dead are attacks against the rich and upper class for their greed and destruction of the country's national resources. Confused Youth is a song about parents forcing their kids to grow up and conform to society's norms, and calls for solidarity among the youth.

Justin later said in 2016 that the last song, Your Daddy Was A Rich Man, was written about a "millionaire real-estate investor from New York City", and his father.

Recording 
Due to their lack of money, the band was unable to book a studio to record in. Because of that, they rented equipment from their local music store and set up a makeshift studio in Andy's house. The drums were set up in the basement, with the rest of the equipment upstairs. According to Justin, "We ran a snake with all the cables through the laundry chute". The process lasted months, with the band eventually recording "around 30-35 songs". Some of the songs recorded during the sessions were later released on their split with dbs North America Sucks (which would later be re-released as Their System Doesn't Work For You).

Track listing

Personnel 
Justin Sane – guitar/vocals
Andy Flag – bass/vocals, mixing on tracks 4,6,7,8,12,13,16, and 17
Pat Thetic – drums
 Andy "Reagan" Wheeler, Ricky "Reagan" Wright, Anne Flag, Mike Poisel, Mike Armstrong, Dan D. Lion, Jason DeCosta, and the band Disco Crisis all provided back up vocals.
Joe West and Anti-Flag - production

Legacy 
Die For The Government and Fuck Police Brutality would later be released on the band's compilation album "A Document of Dissent" on Fat Wreck Chords in 2013. Kill the Rich would be rerecorded for the band's 20 Years of Hell series in 2012. In 2017, the band launched the Die For the Government 20th Anniversary Tour to celebrate the album's anniversary, where they played the album in its entirety for the first time ever along with the band's hits.

Die For The Government was later covered by German punk band ZSK and Russian punk band Tarakany!.

References 

1997 albums
Anti-Flag albums
New Red Archives albums